The Indian Federation of United Nations Associations is the leading independent policy authority on the United Nations in India and an India-wide grassroots membership organisation.

Indian Federation of United Nations Associations ( IFUNA ) was established more than six decades ago. Indian Federation of United Nations Associations is affiliated with the World Federation of United Nations Associations (WFUNA). IFUNA is the only body to represent India in the U.N. Forums. The 1st President of IFUNA was Late Smt. Vijaya Laxmi Pandit who represented India as President of the General Assembly of United Nations. A Galaxy of Luminaries had adorned the office of President of IFUNA.

UNA members 
IFUNA has a network of affiliated State United Nations Associations in various states of the country such as Andhra Pradesh, Assam, Bihar, Chandigarh, Chhattisgarh, Gujarat. Haryana, Himachal Pradesh, Kerala, Karnataka, Madhya Pradesh, Maharashtra, Manipur, Meghalaya, Orissa, Rajasthan, Tamil Nadu, Uttar Pradesh and West Bengal.

See also 
 United Nations
 United Nations Association
 World Federation of United Nations Associations
 League of Nations Union

Footnotes

External links 
 Indian Federation of United Nations Associations

1953 establishments in India
Volunteer organisations in India
Organizations established in 1953
World Federation of United Nations Associations
India and the United Nations